Dyemus purpureopulcher is a species of beetle in the family Cerambycidae.

References

Apomecynini
Beetles described in 1948